Lamphun Warriors Football Club (Thai: สโมสรฟุตบอลลำพูน วอริเออร์) is a Thai professional Association football club based in Lamphun province. The club plays in Thai League 1. Lamphun Warriors has participated in the Thai Premier League since 2022 after having won the Thai League 2 title in 2021–22.

Stadium and locations

History
In 2011, Lamphun Warriors Football Club is formed as Lamphun Warriors Football Club, nicknamed The White Cattles. Home games to be played at Mae Guang Stadium .In 2011, the club join the professional league that was 2011 Thai Division 2 League Northern Region.

In 2021, Lamphun Warriors have entered as the promoted teams from the 2021–22 Thai League 2 as a champions. This is the first time in the history of the club that the Lamphun Warriors can step up to play in the top league in Thailand. Since the club's inception in 2011.

Season by season record

P = Played
W = Games won
D = Games drawn
L = Games lost
F = Goals for
A = Goals against
Pts = Points
Pos = Final position
N/A = No answer

QR1 = First Qualifying Round
QR2 = Second Qualifying Round
QR3 = Third Qualifying Round
QR4 = Fourth Qualifying Round
RInt = Intermediate Round
R1 = Round 1
R2 = Round 2
R3 = Round 3

R4 = Round 4
R5 = Round 5
R6 = Round 6
GR = Group stage
QF = Quarter-finals
SF = Semi-finals
RU = Runners-up
W = Winners

Honours

Domestic leagues
Thai League 2
  Winners : 2021–22

Thai League 3
  Winners : 2020–21

Thai League 3 Northern Region
  Winners : 2020–21

Regional League Northern Division
Runner-up : 2011

Regional League Championships
2011 : Group stage

Players

Current squad

Out on loan

Club Staff

References

External links
 Facebookpage of Lamphun Warriors F.C.

 
Football clubs in Thailand
Association football clubs established in 2011
Sport in Lamphun province
2011 establishments in Thailand
Thai League 1 clubs